Body Confusion is a 2004 Spanish fantasy comedy-drama film written and directed by  which stars Gustavo Salmerón, José Coronado, and Goya Toledo.

Plot 
Bruno, a Guardia Civil agent at a low-ebb, finds out that he actually is an actor (Alex) portraying a character in a movie.

Cast

Production 
The film is a Cartel production. Shooting locations included Madrid and its surroundings.

Release 
The film was presented at the Málaga Film Festival in April 2004. It was released theatrically in Spain on 13 August 2004.

Reception 
Mirito Torreiro of Fotogramas rated the film 3 out of 5 stars, considering that the helmer get himself into a mess from which he emerges well and on his own feet, highlighting a script full of smart cheats.

Accolades 

|-
| align = "center" rowspan = "2" | 2004 || rowspan = "2" | 7th Málaga Film Festival || Best Director || Vicente Peñarrocha ||  || rowspan = "2" | 
|-
| Best Screenplay || Vicente Peñarrocha || 
|-
| align = "center" | 2005 || 19th Goya Awards || Best New Director || Vicente Peñarrocha ||  || align = "center" | 
|}

See also 
 List of Spanish films of 2004

References 

Spanish comedy-drama films
2004 comedy-drama films
2000s Spanish-language films
2004 directorial debut films
2000s Spanish films
Spanish fantasy comedy films
Spanish fantasy drama films
Films shot in Madrid
Films about actors